The 2021 All-Ireland Senior Ladies' Football Championship was the 48th edition of the Ladies' Gaelic Football Association's premier inter-county ladies' Gaelic Football tournament.

 were the holders and were aiming to complete a five-in-a-row. They met Meath, last year's intermediate champions, in the final. Meath won the final to record their first ever senior football title.

Format

Group stage
The 13 teams are drawn into one group of four teams and three groups of three teams. Each team play each other team in its group once, earning three points for a win and one for a draw.

Relegation
The last-placed team in each group play off to decide relegation.

Knockout stage
The top two in each group progress to the All-Ireland quarter-finals.

Fixtures and results

Group games take place 9–24 July 2021.

Group 1

Group 2

Group 3

Group 4

Relegation playoffs

Tyrone are relegated to the All-Ireland Intermediate Ladies' Football Championship for 2022.

Finals

See also
2021 All-Ireland Intermediate Ladies' Football Championship
2021 All-Ireland Junior Ladies' Football Championship
2021 Ladies' National Football League

References

All Ireland
Ladies
Ladies
Ladies' Gaelic football